Selo imeni Shaumyana is a rural locality (a selo) in Krasnoarmeysky Selsoviet, Kizlyarsky District, Republic of Dagestan, Russia. The population was 1,204 as of 2010. There are 11 streets.

Geography 
It is located 4 km northwest of Kizlyar (the district's administrative centre) by road. Imeni Kirova and Krasny Voskhod are the nearest rural localities.

Nationalities 
Avars, Laks, Rutuls and Russians live there.

References 

Rural localities in Kizlyarsky District